I Couldn't Believe My Eyes is an album by blues musicians Brownie McGhee and Sonny Terry with Earl Hooker recorded in 1969 but not released by the BluesWay label until 1973.

Track listing
All compositions credited to Brownie McGhee except where noted
 "Black Cat Bone" (Brownie McGhee, Sonny Terry) – 3:16
 "Brownie's New Blues" – 4:59
 "Poor Man Blues" (Terry) – 2:49
 "Tell Me Why" – 6:16
 "My Baby's Fine" (Terry) – 3:03
 "Don't Wait for Me" – 3:21
 "I'm in Love With You Baby" (Terry) – 4:28
 "Parcel Post Blues" – 4:27
 "When I Was Drinkin'" (Terry) – 2:42
 "I Couldn't Believe My Eyes" – 3:29

Personnel
Brownie McGhee – guitar, vocals
Sonny Terry – harmonica, vocals
Earl Hooker – guitar
Ray Johnson – piano, electric piano
Jimmy Bond – bass
Panama Francis – drums
Clark Kidder, George McGhee, Marsha Smith – vocals (tracks 1, 3 & 6)

References

Brownie McGhee albums
Sonny Terry albums
Earl Hooker albums
1973 albums
BluesWay Records albums